PanFlu can refer to :
pandemic influenza
Panflu or PANFLU.1, specific pandemic flu vaccines from Sinovac Biotech
a preclinical pan flu vaccine against flu replikins.